"Dinosaur Laser Fight" is the debut single by American comedy rock duo Ninja Sex Party, released on August 17, 2011. The song is included as a track on the band's debut studio album NSFW.

Music video
The music video for "Dinosaur Laser Fight" premiered on YouTube on August 17, 2011. The video was the ninth music video to be uploaded to the official Ninja Sex Party YouTube channel. The video, which depicts the fictitious characters of Danny Sexbang and Ninja Brian attempting to teach a science class, was directed by Eric Smith and Jim Turner. Arin Hanson, an animator also known as Egoraptor, provided the video's animated sequences. Avidan would later be integrated into Hanson's Let's Play webseries Game Grumps.

Track listing

Reception
The song has received positive reception. Sam Proof of CraveOnline wrote that it is a "hilarious song" and jokingly called it a "real history lesson". John Eckes of the website One of Us listed "Dinosaur Laser Fight" as the best Ninja Sex Party song, calling it "every boyhood fantasy I ever had mashed into one concentrated song of awesome".

Personnel
Ninja Sex Party
Dan Avidan – vocals
Brian Wecht – keyboards, production
Additional personnel
Arin Hanson – laser sounds, artwork

Charts

Release history

Level Up version 

A re-recorded version of "Dinosaur Laser Fight", from their 2021 album Level Up which contains new versions of previously released songs, was released as the album's second single.

References

2011 songs
2011 debut singles
Ninja Sex Party songs
Songs about dinosaurs